Majestic Hotel & Spa in Barcelona, Catalonia, Spain is a hotel located on 68 Passeig de Gràcia in the Eixample district.  It is located not far from Gaudí's La Pedrera and about one kilometre from La Rambla.

It has existed as a hotel for more than 100 years and is currently owned by the Soldevila family. It is part of the Majestic Hotel Group, which has 3 more hotels in Barcelona: Murmuri Hotel, Hotel Midmost, and Denit Hotel. There is also one hotel in Palma de Mallorca, the Sant Francesc Hotel. Operating as a hotel since 1918, it was originally called Majestic Hotel Inglaterra until it was renamed in 1940 to Hotel Majestic. Famous events and celebrities passed by the hotel, for example Antonio Machado spent his last days in Spain at the hotel before going to Collioure, France. Pablo Picasso, Joan Miró, Charles Trenet, and Ernest Hemingway were also guests at the Majestic. One of the most notable guests was the queen Maria Cristina de Habsburgo-Lorena.

References

External links
 Hotel Majestic Barcelona
 Majestic Hotel Group
 

Hotels in Barcelona
Hotels established in 1918
Hotel buildings completed in 1918
Spanish companies established in 1918